The Civil War of Wa or  was a period of disturbances and warfare in ancient Japan (Wa) during the late Yayoi period (2nd century AD). It is the oldest war in Japan that has been documented in writing. Peace was restored around 180, when the shaman queen Himiko (Pimiko) of Yamatai-koku took control of the region.

Chinese written sources
The war falls into Japan's protohistoric period. While the earliest Japanese national chronicles Kojiki and Nihon Shoki begin their accounts from the Age of the Gods, they are largely mythological in nature, and the account in the Nihon Shoki is reliable as a history only after about the late 6th century. The Chinese Dynastic Histories are an important written source for Japanese history before the 6th century and contain the only written account of this 2nd century war. Japanese history is recounted in sections on the "barbarian" neighbours of China at the end of each dynastic history in the form of a footnote rather than a major chapter. Consequently, information on the conflict is very limited. The earliest mention is in the passages referred to as the Wajinden of the Wei Zhi (ca. 297), which is part of the Records of the Three Kingdoms. Subsequent histories mentioning the conflict such as the Book of the Later Han (ca. 445), the Book of Liang (635), the Book of Sui (636) and the History of Northern Dynasties (mid 7th century) draw much from earlier works.

The following are the complete passages of the Wei Zhi, the Book of the Later Han, the Book of Sui and the History of Northern Dynasties dealing with the civil war:

The Book of Liang speaks of "great disturbances" between 178 and 183.

Archaeological evidence
There is no direct archaeological evidence for the civil war. However archaeological findings of stone or metal weapons and of defensive villages, particularly from the eastern Inland Sea to Kinki support the occurrence of battles during the Yayoi period.

Discussion
Even though the basic course of events is the same in all of the histories, they differ in details and language. Due to the limited information provided in the sources various theories have been put forth by historians.

The Yayoi period is characterised by the introduction of rice cultivation and metallurgy from China or Korea, the development towards an agrarian society and the establishment of a social class structure. In the mid Yayoi period, community leaders managed to extend their authority over small regions the size of present-day districts; thanks partially to the control of imports and technology. These petty states established diplomatic contacts with China by the 1st century and the resulting increased influx of goods and technology or recognition of some local chieftains by China led to a further consolidation of political power.

Location
The war is thought to have occurred around Yamatai, the chiefdom which Himiko came to rule. However the exact location of Yamatai in Japan is not known and a major source of discussion in ancient Japanese history with most scholars favouring a location in either northern Kyushu or Kinai, the latter being close to the later Yamato Province, the former close to Yamato, Fukuoka, with which it might share its name.

Time
All of the historical sources agree that the conflict happened in the latter part of the 2nd century and ended in the 180s. However it is variously quoted as having lasted from between five and eighty years. The distinction of great (disturbances) in the Book of Liang suggests that earlier fightings that are included in the longer time frames of other sources were comparably minor and not worth mentioning for the authors of the Liang shu.

Cause
The cause of the war is not known. A smoldering political situation around the mid 2nd century or a power struggle between the Wa kingdoms have been named as possible origins.

Outcome
The number of chiefdoms known to the Chinese had been reduced from over a hundred before the war to around thirty at the time of Himiko. The rebellion also led to the formation of an early polity under Himiko's rule and as such is considered as a turning point between Yayoi and Kofun period.

See also
Five kings of Wa
List of Japanese battles
Tōdaijiyama Sword

Notes

References

Bibliography

Further reading

Battles involving Japan
Yayoi period
2nd-century conflicts
Civil wars involving the states and peoples of Asia
Rebellions in Japan
2nd century in Japan
Yamatai